Paramount Theatre is a theatre in Boston on Washington Street, between Avery and West Streets.

History
The Paramount opened in 1932 as a 1,700-seat, single-screen movie theatre. It was one of the first movie houses in Boston to play talking motion pictures. The theatre was named after its original owner, Paramount Pictures. It closed in 1976 and most of the Art Deco interior decoration was destroyed in the 1980s during the removal of asbestos. In 1984, the building was designated a Boston Landmark by the Boston Landmarks Commission.

In 2002, Millennium Partners agreed to restore the Paramount's facade, marquee, and vertical sign in exchange for city approval of their adjacent Ritz-Carlton Towers project. The city occasionally lighted the sign at night. The city's hopes that the site would be developed by the Cambridge-based American Repertory Theater were not fulfilled. 

In April 2005, Emerson College announced plans to renovate the Paramount Theatre and build a performing arts facility in and around the original building. Design was by Elkus Manfredi Architects, Boston. Acentech Incorporated consulted on the acoustical design of the facility, providing guidance on room acoustics, sound isolation between the stacked spaces on the tight urban site, and mechanical system noise control in the historic building.

The project was completed in early 2010. On March 18, 2010, Emerson College celebrated the grand re-opening of the Paramount Theater with Mayor Thomas Menino.

References

Boston Globe: "Paramount Regains its Grandeur," March 3, 2010, accessed March 4, 2010
Emerson College Today: David Rosen, "Preservation, landmarks expert reviews Paramount Theatre art replicas," October 2008, accessed March 4, 2010
Emerson College Today: "Paramount Theatre awarded major grant," October 2007, accessed March 4, 2010
Emerson College Today: "Planning proceeds for College’s Paramount Center development on Washington Street," December 2005, accessed March 4, 2010
Boston Redevelopment Authority: Press Releases: "Mayor Menino, Emerson Take Center Stage in Paramount Theatre Revitalization Plan," April 13, 2005, accessed March 4, 2010

External links 

Paramount Theatre
City of Boston, Paramount Theatre Paramount Theatre Study Report

Culture of Boston
Emerson College
University and college theatres in the United States
Event venues established in 1932
Theatres in Boston
Cinemas and movie theaters in Massachusetts
Boston Theater District
1932 establishments in Massachusetts
Landmarks in Boston